The Baltic song festivals are traditional amateur song and dance festivals in the Baltic states included in the UNESCO Intangible Cultural Heritage List.

The first song festival was held in Zürich, Switzerland in June 1843. It was attended by 2,184 singers (:de:Schweizerisches Gesangsfest). The tradition spread to Würzburg, Germany in 1845 and from there it reached the Baltic states via Baltic Germans and their choral societies. Firstly it was held in 1869 in Estonia (Estonian Song Festival), and in 1873 in Latvia (Latvian Song and Dance Festival). Lastly the tradition came to the Lithuania (Lithuanian Song Festival) in 1924.

These festivals are massive events attracting some 30,000 singers. The festivals, held every five years in Estonia and Latvia and every four years in Lithuania, celebrate traditional folk songs and dances. During the Soviet era, the festivals were a subtle political protest against communism. In the late 1980s, songs became an integral part of the independence movement, sometimes known as the Singing Revolution.
In 2014, the Estonian Song Festival attracted a total of 159 300 people. This was the largest figure since Estonian re-independence.

References

1869 introductions
Masterpieces of the Oral and Intangible Heritage of Humanity
Folk festivals in Estonia
Folk festivals in Latvia
Folk festivals in Lithuania
Music festivals established in 1869